Morelli's Gelato is a producer and retailer of ice cream. The company was founded in 1907 by Giuseppe Morelli. Initially he sold ice cream from a bicycle with his son Mario. As the business grew, an ice cream van was used. In 1932, an ice cream parlour was opened on the seafront of the seaside resort of Broadstairs.

The company now has several branches which included a flagship concession in Harrods Food Hall and more recently, the historic Covent Garden market building and Portobello Road as well as global franchises in Dubai (Dubai Mall, JBR and Mall of Emirates), Kuwait (Avenues Mall), Bahrain Bahrain City Centre , Saudi Arabia (Mall of Dhahran), Manila, (Rockwell and Shangri-La Plaza), Kuala Lumpur (Bangsar), Tbilisi (Saburtalo), Libreville (Pont Gué Gué) and the Café de Paris, Monte Carlo.

Morellis have opened a summer pop-up at the vintage Dreamland Theme Park.

In addition to luxury gelato which is produced fresh every day, in every store, Morelli's gelato also serve their own blend of Kilimanjaro coffee and their signature, elaborate, retro sundaes.

Morellis has also featured many times in TV/Films, such as Mary Berry, BBC's The One Show and The Lady in the Van. It has also been voted No1 of the 5 Best Ice Cream parlours in the UK by the Telegraph, Top 10 by The Times, and Stylist magazine, as well as some of the best gelato in London and the best ice cream in Britain by Conde Nast Traveller.

History

The Morelli family arrived in the UK from Italy in 1907. Soon after Mario Morelli began making ice cream, which he sold from a bicycle in Scotland and Northern Ireland. In 1932 Morelli opened an ice cream parlour and cappuccino bar on the seafront in Broadstairs, Kent. The ice cream parlour continues to serve visitors to Broadstairs today. After Mario Morelli's retirement the business was taken over by his son Giuseppe Morelli in 1954. He opened a second parlour/espresso bar in Broadstairs in 1955. In 1957 he rebuilt the Broadstairs ice cream parlour, which was the first of its kind in the UK selling over 20 flavours of ice cream.

In 1972 the two ice cream parlours in Broadstairs were taken over by Giuseppe's eldest Son, Marino Morelli. Each generation has contributed to the development of the business. Marino Morelli, while continuing the Gelato business, also focused on building what was at the time the biggest private coffee chain in the UK (with over 30 units), a bakery and sandwich factory. The parlour served more than 20 flavours, made in front of the customer and a variety of ice cream sundaes, which are still produced Broadstairs, London and the many franchised units around the world.

Heading the 5th generation family business, his daughter Bibi Morelli joined Morelli's Gelato in 2003 and took over fully in 2005, on Marino's retirement. She has since built the international franchise arm of the business which has recently seen the sale of Marka PJSC, a retail start up listed on the Dubai Stock Exchange, of the UAE franchise operations of Morelli's Gelato for US$8.4million, with plans to expand by opening 17 additional Morelli's gelato stores in the MENA region by 2020.

Current Morelli’s Gelato Units

Broadstairs, UK 1932 (historic flagship store)
Harrods, UK, (2003–2013)
Selfridge's UK, (2006–2010)
The Avenue, Kuwait, 2007
Café de Paris, Monaco, 2008
Dubai Mall, UAE, 2009
Saburtab, Tbilisi, 2011
Mall of Dhahran, Saudi Arabia, 2011
Bahrain City Centre, Bahrain, 2012
Rockwell, Manila, 2012
Zaguan Bakery, Dallas, 2012
ShangriLa Mall, Manila, 2013
JBR, Dubai, 2014
Bangsar Shopping Centre, Malaysia, 2014
Covent Garden, London, 2014
Mall of Emirates, Dubai, 2015
Pont de Guegue, Libreville, 2015
Portobello Road, London, 2016
Empire Subang, Kuala Lumpur, 2016

New Openings in 2016
Qatar, Mall of Qatar, Q3
Mexico City, Q3
Dalma Mall, Abu Dhabi, Q3

References

External links

Food and drink companies established in 1907
Ice cream brands
Ice cream parlors
Companies based in Kent
1907 establishments in Scotland